Erkki Miinala (born 19 August 1986 in Kemi) is a Finnish goalball player. He began playing at age ten, but did not become serious about the sport until 19. His visual impairment is due to retinitis pigmentosa which is an inherited, degenerative eye disease that causes severe vision impairment. Outside goalball he plays drums in a rock band and works as a transcriber. He was a member of Finland's gold medal-winning men's goalball team at the 2012 Summer Paralympics.

References 

Goalball players at the 2008 Summer Paralympics
Goalball players at the 2012 Summer Paralympics
Goalball players at the 2016 Summer Paralympics
Paralympic gold medalists for Finland
People from Kemi
1986 births
Living people
Medalists at the 2012 Summer Paralympics
Male goalball players
Paralympic goalball players of Finland
Paralympic medalists in goalball
Sportspeople from Lapland (Finland)